San Jerónimo (Los Barbosa) is a locality and municipal agency of San Martín de Hidalgo Municipality, Jalisco, Mexico. As of the 2010 census, the village had a total population of 355, making it the eleventh-largest locality in the municipality and the second-largest in the territorial sub-committee. 

San Jerónimo is the home of the state-funded San Jerónimo Dam which cost 

It is situated 45 miles southwest of Guadalajara, and 80 miles east of Puerto Vallarta.

History
The village of San Jerónimo was first annotated as one of the settlements comprising the jurisdiction of Cocula in 1744.

Demographics

2010
According to the 2010 Censo General de Población y Vivienda, San Jerónimo (Los Barbosa) had a population of 355 inhabitants, of which 164 were male and 191 were female. There were 103 inhabited houses.

Government
San Jerónimo is one of the 18 municipal agencies of San Martín de Hidalgo Municipality and belongs to the territorial sub-committee of Santa Cruz de las Flores. A municipal agent and a municipal sub-agent preside over San Jerónimo in the administrative and representative sense and are appointed and removed by the municipal council.

San Jerónimo is located in the 18th Local Electoral District.

Agriculture
San Jerónimo was incorporated into an ejido on March 25, 1925, with a total of 582 hectares of communal land.

Unincorporated communities
 La Madera, part of the village
 Planta de Beneficio, former settlement outside the village

Localities
El Cerrito de los Tapia
La Barranca de San Jerónimo

References

External links
   San Jerónimo's official website
    Information of San Jerónimo
    Information of the Municipality

Populated places in Jalisco